Mammone is a surname. Notable people with the surname include:

  (born 1959), Italian jazz musician
 Richard Mammone (born 1953), American engineer, inventor, entrepreneur, and professor
 Robert Mammone (born 1971), Australian actor